Pterosaurs (from Greek pteron and sauros, meaning "wing lizard") is an extinct clade of flying reptiles in the order Pterosauria. They existed during most of the Mesozoic: from the Late Triassic to the end of the Cretaceous (228 to 66 million years ago). Pterosaurs are the earliest vertebrates known to have evolved powered flight. Their wings were formed by a membrane of skin, muscle, and other tissues stretching from the ankles to a dramatically lengthened fourth finger.

There were two major types of pterosaurs. Basal pterosaurs (also called 'non-pterodactyloid pterosaurs' or 'rhamphorhynchoids') were smaller animals with fully toothed jaws and, typically, long tails. Their wide wing membranes probably included and connected the hind legs. On the ground, they would have had an awkward sprawling posture, but the anatomy of their joints and strong claws would have made them effective climbers, and some may have even lived in trees. Basal pterosaurs were insectivores or predators of small vertebrates. Later pterosaurs (pterodactyloids) evolved many sizes, shapes, and lifestyles. Pterodactyloids had narrower wings with free hind limbs, highly reduced tails, and long necks with large heads. On the ground, pterodactyloids walked well on all four limbs with an upright posture, standing plantigrade on the hind feet and folding the wing finger upward to walk on the three-fingered "hand". They could take off from the ground, and fossil trackways show at least some species were able to run and wade or swim. Their jaws had horny beaks, and some groups lacked teeth. Some groups developed elaborate head crests with sexual dimorphism.

Pterosaurs sported coats of hair-like filaments known as pycnofibers, which covered their bodies and parts of their wings. Pycnofibers grew in several forms, from simple filaments to branching down feathers. These may be homologous to the down feathers found on both avian and some non-avian dinosaurs, suggesting that early feathers evolved in the common ancestor of pterosaurs and dinosaurs, possibly as insulation. In life, pterosaurs would have had smooth or fluffy coats that did not resemble bird feathers. They were warm-blooded (endothermic), active animals. The respiratory system had efficient unidirectional "flow-through" breathing using air sacs, which hollowed out their bones to an extreme extent. Pterosaurs spanned a wide range of adult sizes, from the very small anurognathids to the largest known flying creatures, including Quetzalcoatlus and Hatzegopteryx, which reached wingspans of at least nine metres. The combination of endothermy, a good oxygen supply and strong muscles made pterosaurs powerful and capable flyers.

Pterosaurs are often referred to by popular media or the general public as "flying dinosaurs", but dinosaurs are defined as the descendants of the last common ancestor of the Saurischia and Ornithischia, which excludes the pterosaurs. Pterosaurs are nonetheless more closely related to birds and other dinosaurs than to crocodiles or any other living reptile, though they are not bird ancestors. Pterosaurs are also colloquially referred to as pterodactyls, particularly in fiction and journalism. However, technically, pterodactyl may  refer to members of the genus Pterodactylus, and more broadly to members of the suborder Pterodactyloidea of the pterosaurs.

Pterosaurs had a variety of lifestyles. Traditionally seen as fish-eaters, the group is now understood to have also included hunters of land animals, insectivores, fruit eaters and even predators of other pterosaurs. They reproduced by eggs, some fossils of which have been discovered.

Description
The anatomy of pterosaurs was highly modified from their reptilian ancestors by the adaptation to flight. Pterosaur bones were hollow and air-filled, like those of birds. This provided a higher muscle attachment surface for a given skeletal weight. The bone walls were often paper-thin. They had a large and keeled breastbone for flight muscles and an enlarged brain able to coordinate complex flying behaviour. Pterosaur skeletons often show considerable fusion. In the skull, the sutures between elements disappeared. In some later pterosaurs, the backbone over the shoulders fused into a structure known as a notarium, which served to stiffen the torso during flight, and provide a stable support for the shoulder blade. Likewise, the sacral vertebrae could form a single synsacrum while the pelvic bones fused also.

Basal pterosaurs include the clades Dimorphodontidae (Dimorphodon), Campylognathididae (Eudimorphodon, Campyognathoides), and Rhamphorhynchidae (Rhamphorhynchus, Scaphognathus).

Pterodactyloids include the clades Ornithocheiroidea (Istiodactylus, Ornithocheirus, Pteranodon), Ctenochasmatoidea (Ctenochasma, Pterodactylus), Dsungaripteroidea (Germanodactylus, Dsungaripterus), and Azhdarchoidea (Tapejara, Tupuxuara, Quetzalcoatlus).

The two groups overlapped in time, but the earliest pterosaurs in the fossil record are basal pterosaurs, and the latest pterosaurs are pterodactyloids.

The position of the clade Anurognathidae (Anurognathus, Jeholopterus, Vesperopterylus) is debated. Anurognathids were highly specialized. Small flyers with shortened jaws and a wide gape, some had large eyes suggesting nocturnal or crepuscular habits, mouth bristles, and feet adapted for clinging. Parallel adaptations are seen in birds and bats that prey on insects in flight.

Size

Pterosaurs had a wide range of sizes, though they were generally large.

Standing, such giants could reach the height of a modern giraffe. Traditionally, it was assumed that pterosaurs were extremely light relative to their size. Later, it was understood that this would imply unrealistically low densities of their soft tissues.

Skull, teeth, and crests

Compared to the other vertebrate flying groups, the birds and bats, pterosaur skulls were typically quite large. Most pterosaur skulls had elongated jaws. Their skull bones tend to be fused in adult individuals. Early pterosaurs often had heterodont teeth, varying in build, and some still had teeth in the palate. In later groups the teeth mostly became conical. Front teeth were often longer, forming a "prey grab" in transversely expanded jaw tips, but size and position were very variable among species. With the derived Pterodactyloidea, the skulls became even more elongated, sometimes surpassing the combined neck and torso in length. This was caused by a stretching and fusion of the front snout bone, the premaxilla, with the upper jaw bone, the maxilla. Unlike most archosaurs, the nasal and antorbital openings of pterodactyloid pterosaurs merged into a single large opening, called the nasoantorbital fenestra. This feature likely evolved to lighten the skull for flight. In contrast, the bones behind the eye socket contracted and rotated, strongly inclining the rear skull and bringing the jaw joint forward. The braincase was relatively large for reptiles.

In some cases, fossilized keratinous beak tissue has been preserved, though in toothed forms, the beak is small and restricted to the jaw tips and does not involve the teeth. Some advanced beaked forms were toothless, such as the Pteranodontidae and Azhdarchidae, and had larger, more extensive, and more bird-like beaks. Some groups had specialised tooth forms. The Istiodactylidae had recurved teeth for eating meat. Ctenochasmatidae used combs of numerous needle-like teeth for filter feeding; Pterodaustro could have over a thousand bristle-like teeth. Dsungaripteridae covered their teeth with jawbone tissue for a crushing function. If teeth were present, they were placed in separate tooth sockets. Replacement teeth were generated behind, not below, the older teeth.

The public image of pterosaurs is defined by their elaborate head crests. This was influenced by the distinctive backward-pointing crest of the well-known Pteranodon. The main positions of such crests are the front of the snout, as an outgrowth of the premaxillae, or the rear of the skull as an extension of the parietal bones in which case it is called a "supraoccipital crest". Front and rear crests can be present simultaneously and might be fused into a single larger structure, the most expansive of which is shown by the Tapejaridae. Nyctosaurus sported a bizarre antler-like crest. The crests were only a few millimetres thin transversely. The bony crest base would typically be extended by keratinous or other soft tissue.

Since the 1990s, new discoveries and a more thorough study of old specimens have shown that crests are far more widespread among pterosaurs than previously assumed. That they were extended by or composed completely of keratin, which does not fossilize easily, had misled earlier research. For Pterorhynchus and Pterodactylus, the true extent of these crests has only been uncovered using ultraviolet photography. While fossil crests used to be restricted to the more advanced Pterodactyloidea, Pterorhynchus and Austriadactylus show that even some early pterosaurs possessed them.

Like the upper jaws, the paired lower jaws of pterosaurs were very elongated. In advanced forms, they tended to be shorter than the upper cranium because the jaw joint was in a more forward position. The front lower jaw bones, the dentaries or ossa dentalia, were at the tip tightly fused into a central symphysis. This made the lower jaws function as a single connected whole, the mandible. The symphysis was often very thin transversely and long, accounting for a considerable part of the jaw length, up to 60%. If a crest was present on the snout, the symphysis could feature a matching mandible crest, jutting out to below. Toothed species also bore teeth in their dentaries. The mandible opened and closed in a simple vertical or "orthal" up-and-down movement.

Vertebral column

The vertebral column of pterosaurs numbered between thirty-four and seventy vertebrae. The vertebrae in front of the tail were "procoelous": the cotyle (front of the vertebral body) was concave and into it fitted a convex extension at the rear of the preceding vertebra, the condyle. Advanced pterosaurs are unique in possessing special processes projecting adjacent to their condyle and cotyle, the exapophyses, and the cotyle also may possess a small prong on its midline called a hypapophysis.

The neck of pterosaurs was relatively long and straight. In pterodactyloids, the neck is typically longer than the torso. This length is not caused by an increase of the number of vertebrae, which is invariably seven. Some researchers include two transitional "cervicodorsals" which brings the number to nine. Instead, the vertebrae themselves became more elongated, up to eight times longer than wide. Nevertheless, the cervicals were wider than high, implying a better vertical than horizontal neck mobility. Pterodactyloids have lost all neck ribs. Pterosaur necks were probably rather thick and well-muscled, especially vertically.

The torso was relatively short and egg-shaped. The vertebrae in the back of pterosaurs originally might have numbered eighteen. With advanced species a growing number of these tended to be incorporated into the sacrum. Such species also often show a fusion of the front dorsal vertebrae into a rigid whole which is called the notarium after a comparable structure in birds. This was an adaptation to withstand the forces caused by flapping the wings. The notarium included three to seven vertebrae, depending on the species involved but also on individual age. These vertebrae could be connected by tendons or a fusion of their neural spines into a "supraneural plate". Their ribs also would be tightly fused into the notarium. In general, the ribs are double-headed. The sacrum consisted of three to ten sacral vertebrae. They too, could be connected via a supraneural plate that, however, would not contact the notarium.

The tails of pterosaurs were always rather slender. This means that the caudofemoralis retractor muscle which in most basal Archosauria provides the main propulsive force for the hindlimb, was relatively unimportant. The tail vertebrae were amphicoelous, the vertebral bodies on both ends being concave. Early species had long tails, containing up to fifty caudal vertebrae, the middle ones stiffened by elongated articulation processes, the zygapophyses, and chevrons. Such tails acted as rudders, sometimes ending at the rear in a vertical diamond-shaped or oval vane. In pterodactyloids, the tails were much reduced and never stiffened, with some species counting as few as ten vertebrae.

Shoulder girdle

The shoulder girdle was a strong structure that transferred the forces of flapping flight to the thorax. It was probably covered by thick muscle layers. The upper bone, the shoulder blade, was a straight bar. It was connected to a lower bone, the coracoid that is relatively long in pterosaurs. In advanced species, their combined whole, the scapulocoracoid, was almost vertically oriented. The shoulder blade in that case fitted into a recess in the side of the notarium, while the coracoid likewise connected to the breastbone. This way, both sides together made for a rigid closed loop, able to withstand considerable forces. A peculiarity was that the breastbone connections of the coracoids often were asymmetrical, with one coracoid attached in front of the other. In advanced species the shoulder joint had moved from the shoulder blade to the coracoid. The joint was saddle-shaped and allowed considerable movement to the wing. It faced sideways and somewhat upwards.

The breastbone, formed by fused paired sterna, was wide. It had only a shallow keel. Via sternal ribs, it was at its sides attached to the dorsal ribs. At its rear, a row of belly ribs or gastralia was present, covering the entire belly. To the front, a long point, the cristospina, jutted obliquely upwards. The rear edge of the breastbone was the deepest point of the thorax. Clavicles or interclavicles were completely absent.

Wings

Pterosaur wings were formed by bones and membranes of skin and other tissues. The primary membranes attached to the extremely long fourth finger of each arm and extended along the sides of the body. Where they ended has been very controversial but since the 1990s a dozen specimens with preserved soft tissue have been found that seem to show they attached to the ankles. The exact curvature of the trailing edge, however, is still equivocal.

While historically thought of as simple leathery structures composed of skin, research has since shown that the wing membranes of pterosaurs were highly complex dynamic structures suited to an active style of flight. The outer wings (from the tip to the elbow) were strengthened by closely spaced fibers called actinofibrils. The actinofibrils themselves consisted of three distinct layers in the wing, forming a crisscross pattern when superimposed on one another. The function of the actinofibrils is unknown, as is the exact material from which they were made. Depending on their exact composition (keratin, muscle, elastic structures, etc.), they may have been stiffening or strengthening agents in the outer part of the wing. The wing membranes also contained a thin layer of muscle, fibrous tissue, and a unique, complex circulatory system of looping blood vessels. The combination of actinofibrils and muscle layers may have allowed the animal to adjust the wing slackness and camber.

As shown by cavities in the wing bones of larger species and soft tissue preserved in at least one specimen, some pterosaurs extended their system of respiratory air sacs into the wing membrane.

Parts of the wing

The pterosaur wing membrane is divided into three basic units. The first, called the propatagium ("fore membrane"), was the forward-most part of the wing and attached between the wrist and shoulder, creating the "leading edge" during flight. The brachiopatagium ("arm membrane") was the primary component of the wing, stretching from the highly elongated fourth finger of the hand to the hindlimbs. Finally, at least some pterosaur groups had a membrane that stretched between the legs, possibly connecting to or incorporating the tail, called the uropatagium; the extent of this membrane is not certain, as studies on Sordes seem to suggest that it simply connected the legs but did not involve the tail (rendering it a cruropatagium). A common interpretation is that non-pterodactyloid pterosaurs had a broader uro/cruropatagium stretched between their long fifth toes, with pterodactyloids, lacking such toes, only having membranes running along the legs.

There has been considerable argument among paleontologists about whether the main wing membranes (brachiopatagia) attached to the hindlimbs, and if so, where. Fossils of the rhamphorhynchoid Sordes, the anurognathid Jeholopterus, and a pterodactyloid from the Santana Formation seem to demonstrate that the wing membrane did attach to the hindlimbs, at least in some species. However, modern bats and flying squirrels show considerable variation in the extent of their wing membranes and it is possible that, like these groups, different species of pterosaur had different wing designs. Indeed, analysis of pterosaur limb proportions shows that there was considerable variation, possibly reflecting a variety of wing-plans.

The bony elements of the arm formed a mechanism to support and extend the wing. Near the body, the humerus or upper arm bone is short but powerfully built. It sports a large deltopectoral crest, to which the major flight muscles are attached. Despite the considerable forces exerted on it, the humerus is hollow or pneumatised inside, reinforced by bone struts. The long bones of the lower arm, the ulna and radius, are much longer than the humerus. They were probably incapable of pronation.

A bone unique to pterosaurs, known as the pteroid, connected to the wrist and helped to support the forward membrane (the propatagium) between the wrist and shoulder. Evidence of webbing between the three free fingers of the pterosaur forelimb suggests that this forward membrane may have been more extensive than the simple pteroid-to-shoulder connection traditionally depicted in life restorations. The position of the pteroid bone itself has been controversial. Some scientists, notably Matthew Wilkinson, have argued that the pteroid pointed forward, extending the forward membrane and allowing it to function as an adjustable flap. This view was contradicted in a 2007 paper by Chris Bennett, who showed that the pteroid did not articulate as previously thought and could not have pointed forward, but rather was directed inward toward the body as traditionally interpreted.  Specimens of Changchengopterus pani and Darwinopterus linglongtaensis show the pteroid in articulation with the proximal syncarpal, suggesting that the pteroid articulated with the 'saddle' of the radiale (proximal syncarpal) and that both the pteroid and preaxial carpal were migrated centralia.

The pterosaur wrist consists of two inner (proximal, at the side of the long bones of the arm) and four outer (distal, at the side of the hand) carpals (wrist bones), excluding the pteroid bone, which may itself be a modified distal carpal. The proximal carpals are fused together into a "syncarpal" in mature specimens, while three of the distal carpals fuse to form a distal syncarpal. The remaining distal carpal, referred to here as the medial carpal, but which has also been termed the distal lateral, or pre-axial carpal, articulates on a vertically elongate biconvex facet on the anterior surface of the distal syncarpal. The medial carpal bears a deep concave fovea that opens anteriorly, ventrally and somewhat medially, within which the pteroid articulates, according to Wilkinson.

In derived pterodactyloids like pteranodontians and azhdarchoids, metacarpals I-III are small and do not connect to the carpus, instead hanging in contact with the fourth metacarpal. With these derived species, the fourth metacarpal has been enormously elongated, typically equalling or exceeding the length of the long bones of the lower arm. The fifth metacarpal had been lost. In all species, the first to third fingers are much smaller than the fourth, the "wingfinger", and contain two, three and four phalanges respectively. The smaller fingers are clawed, with the ungual size varying among species. In nyctosaurids the forelimb digits besides the wingfinger have been lost altogether. The wingfinger accounts for about half or more of the total wing length. It normally consists of four phalanges. Their relative lengths tend to vary among species, which has often been used to distinguish related forms. The fourth phalanx is usually the shortest. It lacks a claw and has been lost completely by nyctosaurids. It is curved to behind, resulting in a rounded wing tip, which reduces induced drag. The wingfinger is also bent somewhat downwards.

When standing, pterosaurs probably rested on their metacarpals, with the outer wing folded to behind. In this position, the "anterior" sides of the metacarpals were rotated to the rear. This would point the smaller fingers obliquely to behind. According to Bennett, this would imply that the wingfinger, able to describe the largest arc of any wing element, up to 175°, was not folded by flexion but by an extreme extension. The wing was automatically folded when the elbow was bowed.

A laser-simulated fluorescence scan on Pterodactylus also identified a membranous "fairing" (area conjunctioning the wing with the body at the neck), as opposed to the feathered or fur-composed "fairing" seen in birds and bats respectively.

Pelvis

The pelvis of pterosaurs was of moderate size compared to the body as a whole. Often the three pelvic bones were fused. The ilium was long and low, its front and rear blades projecting horizontally beyond the edges of the lower pelvic bones. Despite this length, the rod-like form of these processes indicates that the hindlimb muscles attached to them were limited in strength. The, in side view narrow, pubic bone fused with the broad ischium into an ischiopubic blade. Sometimes, the blades of both sides were also fused, closing the pelvis from below and forming the pelvic canal. The hip joint was not perforated and allowed considerable mobility to the leg. It was directed obliquely upwards, preventing a perfectly vertical position of the leg.

The front of the pubic bones articulated with a unique structure, the paired prepubic bones. Together these formed a cusp covering the rear belly, between the pelvis and the belly ribs. The vertical mobility of this element suggests a function in breathing, compensating the relative rigidity of the chest cavity.

Hindlimbs
The hindlimbs of pterosaurs were strongly built, yet relative to their wingspans smaller than those of birds. They were long in comparison to the torso length. The thighbone was rather straight, with the head making only a small angle with the shaft. This implies that the legs were not held vertically below the body but were somewhat sprawling. The shinbone was often fused with the upper ankle bones into a tibiotarsus that was longer than the thighbone. It could attain a vertical position when walking. The calf bone tended to be slender, especially at its lower end that in advanced forms did not reach the ankle, sometimes reducing total length to a third. Typically it was fused to the shinbone. The ankle was a simple, "mesotarsal", hinge. The, rather long and slender, metatarsus was always splayed to some degree. The foot was plantigrade, meaning that during the walking cycle the sole of the metatarsus was pressed onto the soil.

There was a clear difference between early pterosaurs and advanced species regarding the form of the fifth digit. Originally, the fifth metatarsal was robust and not very shortened. It was connected to the ankle in a higher position than the other metatarsals. It bore a long, and often curved, mobile clawless fifth toe consisting of two phalanges. The function of this element has been enigmatic. It used to be thought that the animals slept upside-down like bats, hanging from branches and using the fifth toes as hooks. Another hypothesis held that they stretched the brachiopatagia, but in articulated fossils the fifth digits are always flexed towards the tail. Later it became popular to assume that these toes extended an uropatagium or cruropatagium between them. As the fifth toes were on the outside of the feet, such a configuration would only have been possible if these rotated their fronts outwards in flight. Such a rotation could be caused by an abduction of the thighbone, meaning that the legs would be spread. This would also turn the feet into a vertical position. They then could act as rudders to control yaw. Some specimens show membranes between the toes, allowing them to function as flight control surfaces. The uropatagium or cruropatagium would control pitch. When walking the toes could flex upwards to lift the membrane from the ground. In Pterodactyloidea, the fifth metatarsal was much reduced and the fifth toe, if present, little more than a stub. This suggests that their membranes were split, increasing flight maneuverability.

The first to fourth toes were long. They had two, three, four and five phalanges respectively. Often the third toe was longest; sometimes the fourth. Flat joints indicate a limited mobility. These toes were clawed but the claws were smaller than the hand claws.

Soft tissues
The rare conditions that allowed for the fossilisation of pterosaur remains, sometimes also preserved soft tissues. Modern synchrotron or ultraviolet light photography has revealed many traces not visible to the naked eye. These are often imprecisely called "impressions" but mostly consist of petrifications, natural casts and transformations of the original material. They may include horn crests, beaks or claw sheaths as well as the various flight membranes. Exceptionally, muscles were preserved. Skin patches show small round non-overlapping scales on the soles of the feet, the ankles and the ends of the metatarsals. They covered pads cushioning the impact of walking. Scales are unknown from other parts of the body.

Pycnofibers

Most or all pterosaurs had hair-like filaments known as pycnofibers on the head and torso. The term "pycnofiber", meaning "dense filament", was coined by palaeontologist Alexander Kellner and colleagues in 2009. Pycnofibers were unique structures similar to, but not homologous (sharing a common origin) with, mammalian hair, an example of convergent evolution. A fuzzy integument was first reported from a specimen of Scaphognathus crassirostris in 1831 by Georg August Goldfuss, but had been widely doubted. Since the 1990s, pterosaur finds and histological and ultraviolet examination of pterosaur specimens have provided incontrovertible proof: pterosaurs had pycnofiber coats. Sordes pilosus (which translates as "hairy demon") and Jeholopterus ninchengensis show pycnofibers on the head and body.

The presence of pycnofibers strongly indicates that pterosaurs were endothermic (warm-blooded). They aided thermoregulation, as is common in warm-blooded animals who need insulation to prevent excessive heat-loss. Pycnofibers were flexible, short filaments, about five to seven millimetres long and rather simple in structure with a hollow central canal. Pterosaur pelts might have been comparable in density to many Mesozoic mammals.

Relation with feathers 
Pterosaur filaments could share a common origin with feathers, as speculated in 2002 by Czerkas and Ji. In 2009, Kellner concluded that pycnofibers were structured similarly to theropod proto-feathers. Others were unconvinced, considering the difference with the "quills" found on many of the bird-like maniraptoran specimens too fundamental.

A 2018 study of the remains of two small Jurassic-age pterosaurs from Inner Mongolia, China, found that pterosaurs had a wide array of pycnofiber shapes and structures, as opposed to the homogeneous structures that had generally been assumed to cover them. Some of these had frayed ends, very similar in structure to four different feather types known from birds or other dinosaurs but almost never known from pterosaurs prior to the study, suggesting homology. A response to this study was published in 2020, where it was suggested that the structures seen on the anurognathids were actually a result of the decomposition of aktinofibrils: a type of fibre used to strengthen and stiffen the wing. However, in a response to this, the authors of the 2018 paper point to the fact that the presence of the structures extend past the patagium, and the presence of both aktinofibrils and filaments on Jeholopterus ningchengensis and Sordes pilosus. The various forms of filament structure present on the anurognathids in the 2018 study would also require a form of decomposition that would cause the different 'filament' forms seen. They therefore conclude that the most parsimonious interpretation of the structures is that they are filamentous proto-feathers. But Liliana D’Alba points out that the description of the preserved integumentary structures on the two anurogmathid specimens is still based upon gross morphology. She also points out that Pterorhynchus was described to have feathers to support the claim that feathers had a common origin with Ornithodirans but was argued against by several authors. The only method to assure if it was homologous to feathers is to use a scanning electron microscope.

In 2022, a new fossil of Tupandactylus cf. imperator was found to have melanosomes in forms that signal an earlier than anticipated development of the patterns found in extant feathers than previously thought. In these fossils, it appears as though the feather melanosomes took on a more complex form than the melanosome organization in scales that near relatives of Tupandactylus had. This discovery is one of many that leads us away from many previous theories of feathers evolving directly from scales in reptiles, given the significant distinction of melanosome organization and content between the two. This indicates a distinct form of melanosomes within feather structures at the time, different from other contemporary feathers that did not carry this formation. The feather fossils obtained from this specimen also suggested the presence of Stage IIIa feathers, a new discovery which may also suggest that more complex feather structures were present at this time. Previously, no Stage III feather forms had been discovered in this time. This study contains multiple indications about the development of feather forms. These include a more precise estimate for the development of avian feather forms, as well as a more ancient ancestor that contained the origins of feather-specific melanosome signaling found in extant birds.

History of discovery

First finds

Pterosaur fossils are very rare, due to their light bone construction. Complete skeletons can generally only be found in geological layers with exceptional preservation conditions, the so-called Lagerstätten. The pieces from one such Lagerstätte, the Late Jurassic Solnhofen Limestone in Bavaria, became much sought after by rich collectors. In 1784, Italian naturalist Cosimo Alessandro Collini was the first scientist to describe a pterosaur fossil. At that time the concepts of evolution and extinction were imperfectly developed. The bizarre build of the pterosaur was shocking, as it could not clearly be assigned to any existing animal group. The discovery of pterosaurs would thus play an important role in the progress of modern paleontology and geology. Scientific opinion at the time was that if such creatures were still alive, only the sea was a credible habitat; Collini suggested it might be a swimming animal that used its long front limbs as paddles. A few scientists continued to support the aquatic interpretation even until 1830, when German zoologist Johann Georg Wagler suggested that Pterodactylus used its wings as flippers and was affiliated with Ichthyosauria and Plesiosauria.

In 1800, Johann Hermann first suggested that it represented a flying creature in a letter to Georges Cuvier. Cuvier agreed in 1801, understanding it was an extinct flying reptile. In 1809, he coined the name Ptéro-Dactyle, "wing-finger". This was in 1815 Latinised to Pterodactylus. At first most species were assigned to this genus and ultimately "pterodactyl" was popularly and incorrectly applied to all members of Pterosauria. Today, paleontologists limit the term to the genus Pterodactylus or members of the Pterodactyloidea.

In 1812 and 1817, Samuel Thomas von Soemmerring redescribed the original specimen and an additional one. He saw them as affiliated to birds and bats. Although he was mistaken in this, his "bat model" would be influential during the 19th century. In 1843, Edward Newman thought pterosaurs were flying marsupials. As the bat model correctly depicted pterosaurs as furred and warm-blooded, it better approached the true physiology of pterosaurs than Cuvier's "reptile model". In 1834, Johann Jakob Kaup coined the term Pterosauria.

Expanding research

In 1828, Mary Anning found in England the first pterosaur genus outside Germany, named as Dimorphodon by Richard Owen, also the first non-pterodactyloid pterosaur known. Later in the century, the Early Cretaceous Cambridge Greensand produced thousands of pterosaur fossils, that however, were of poor quality, consisting mostly of strongly eroded fragments. Nevertheless, based on these, numerous genera and species would be named. Many were described by Harry Govier Seeley, at the time the main English expert on the subject, who also wrote the first pterosaur book, Ornithosauria, and in 1901 the first popular book, Dragons of the Air. Seeley thought that pterosaurs were warm-blooded and dynamic creatures, closely related to birds. Earlier, the evolutionist St. George Jackson Mivart had suggested pterosaurs were the direct ancestors of birds. Owen opposed the views of both men, seeing pterosaurs as cold-blooded "true" reptiles.

In the US, Othniel Charles Marsh in 1870 discovered Pteranodon in the Niobrara Chalk, then the largest known pterosaur, the first toothless one and the first from America. These layers too rendered thousands of fossils, also including relatively complete skeletons that were three-dimensionally preserved instead of being strongly compressed as with the Solnhofen specimens. This led to a much better understanding of many anatomical details, such as the hollow nature of the bones.

Meanwhile, finds from the Solnhofen had continued, accounting for the majority of complete high quality specimens discovered. They allowed to identify most new basal taxa, such as Rhamphorhynchus, Scaphognathus and Dorygnathus. This material gave birth to a German school of pterosaur research, which saw flying reptiles as the warm-blooded, furry and active Mesozoic counterparts of modern bats and birds. In 1882, Marsh and Karl Alfred Zittel published studies about the wing membranes of specimens of Rhamphorhynchus. German studies continued well into the 1930s, describing new species such as Anurognathus. In 1927, Ferdinand Broili discovered hair follicles in pterosaur skin, and paleoneurologist Tilly Edinger determined that the brains of pterosaurs more resembled those of birds than modern cold-blooded reptiles.

In contrast, English and American paleontologists by the middle of the twentieth century largely lost interest in pterosaurs. They saw them as failed evolutionary experiments, cold-blooded and scaly, that hardly could fly, the larger species only able to glide, being forced to climb trees or throw themselves from cliffs to achieve a take-off. In 1914, for the first time pterosaur aerodynamics were quantitatively analysed, by Ernest Hanbury Hankin and David Meredith Seares Watson, but they interpreted Pteranodon as a pure glider. Little research was done on the group during the 1940s and 1950s.

Pterosaur renaissance

The situation for dinosaurs was comparable. From the 1960s onwards, a dinosaur renaissance took place, a quick increase in the number of studies and critical ideas, influenced by the discovery of additional fossils of Deinonychus, whose spectacular traits refuted what had become entrenched orthodoxy. In 1970, likewise the description of the furry pterosaur Sordes began what Robert Bakker named a renaissance of pterosaurs. Kevin Padian especially propagated the new views, publishing a series of studies depicting pterosaurs as warm-blooded, active and running animals. This coincided with a revival of the German school through the work of Peter Wellnhofer, who in 1970s laid the foundations of modern pterosaur science. In 1978, he published the first pterosaur textbook, the Handbuch der Paläoherptologie, Teil 19: Pterosauria, and in 1991 the second ever popular science pterosaur book, the Encyclopedia of Pterosaurs.

This development accelerated through the exploitation of two new Lagerstätten. During the 1970s, the Early Cretaceous Santana Formation in Brazil began to produce chalk nodules that, though often limited in size and the completeness of the fossils they contained, perfectly preserved three-dimensional pterosaur skeletal parts. German and Dutch institutes bought such nodules from fossil poachers and prepared them in Europe, allowing their scientists to describe many new species and revealing a whole new fauna. Soon, Brazilian researchers, among them Alexander Kellner, intercepted the trade and named even more species.

Even more productive was the Early Cretaceous Chinese Jehol Biota of Liaoning that since the 1990s has brought forth hundreds of exquisitely preserved two-dimensional fossils, often showing soft tissue remains. Chinese researchers such as Lü Junchang have again named many new taxa. As discoveries also increased in other parts of the world, a sudden surge in the total of named genera took place. By 2009, when they had increased to about ninety, this growth showed no sign of levelling-off. In 2013, M.P. Witton indicated that the number of discovered pterosaur species had risen to 130. Over ninety percent of known taxa has been named during the "renaissance". Many of these were from groups the existence of which had been unknown. Advances in computing power enabled researchers to determine their complex relationships through the quantitative method of cladistics. New and old fossils yielded much more information when subjected to modern ultraviolet light or roentgen photography, or CAT-scans. Insights from other fields of biology were applied to the data obtained. All this resulted in a substantial progress in pterosaur research, rendering older accounts in popular science books completely outdated.

In 2017 a fossil from a 170-million-year-old pterosaur, later named as the species Dearc sgiathanach in 2022, was discovered on the Isle of Skye in Scotland. The National Museum of Scotland claims that it the largest of its kind ever discovered from the Jurassic period, and it has been described as the world’s best-preserved skeleton of a pterosaur.

Evolution and extinction

Origins

Because pterosaur anatomy has been so heavily modified for flight, and immediate transitional fossil predecessors have not so far been described, the ancestry of pterosaurs is not fully understood. The oldest known pterosaurs were already fully adapted to a flying lifestyle. Since Seeley, it was recognised that pterosaurs were likely to have had their origin in the "archosaurs", what today would be called the Archosauromorpha. In the 1980s, early cladistic analyses found that they were Avemetatarsalians (archosaurs closer to dinosaurs than to crocodilians). As this would make them also rather close relatives of the dinosaurs, these results were seen by Kevin Padian as confirming his interpretation of pterosaurs as bipedal warm-blooded animals. Because these early analyses were based on a limited number of taxa and characters, their results were inherently uncertain. Several influential researchers who rejected Padian's conclusions offered alternative hypotheses. David Unwin proposed an ancestry among the basal Archosauromorpha, specifically long-necked forms ("protorosaurs") such as tanystropheids. A placement among basal archosauriforms like Euparkeria was also suggested. Some basal archosauromorphs seem at first glance to be good candidates for close pterosaur relatives due to their long-limbed anatomy; one example is Sharovipteryx, a "protorosaur" with skin membranes on its hindlimbs likely used for gliding. A 1999 study by Michael Benton found that pterosaurs were avemetatarsalians closely related to Scleromochlus, and named the group Ornithodira to encompass pterosaurs and dinosaurs.

Two researchers, S. Christopher Bennett in 1996, and paleoartist David Peters in 2000, published analyses finding pterosaurs to be protorosaurs or closely related to them. However, Peters gathered novel anatomical data using an unverified technique called "Digital Graphic Segregation" (DGS), which involves digitally tracing over images of pterosaur fossils using photo editing software. Bennett only recovered pterosaurs as close relatives of the protorosaurs after removing characteristics of the hindlimb from his analysis, to test the possibility of locomotion-based convergent evolution between pterosaurs and dinosaurs. A 2007 reply by Dave Hone and Michael Benton could not reproduce this result, finding pterosaurs to be closely related to dinosaurs even without hindlimb characters. They also criticized David Peters for drawing conclusions without access to the primary evidence, that is, the pterosaur fossils themselves. Hone and Benton concluded that, although more basal pterosauromorphs are needed to clarify their relationships, current evidence indicates that pterosaurs are avemetatarsalians, as either the sister group of Scleromochlus or a branch between the latter and Lagosuchus. An 2011 archosaur-focused phylogenetic analysis by Sterling Nesbitt benefited from far more data and found strong support for pterosaurs being avemetatarsalians, though Scleromochlus was not included due to its poor preservation. A 2016 archosauromorph-focused study by Martin Ezcurra included various proposed pterosaur relatives, yet also found pterosaurs to be closer to dinosaurs and unrelated to more basal taxa. Working from his 1996 analysis, Bennett published a 2020 study on Scleromochlus which argued that both Scleromochlus and pterosaurs were non-archosaur archosauromorphs, albeit not particularly closely related to each other. By contrast, a later 2020 study proposed that lagerpetid archosaurs were the sister clade to pterosauria. This was based on newly described fossil skulls and forelimbs showing various anatomical similarities with pterosaurs and reconstructions of lagerpetid brains and sensory systems based on CT scans also showing neuroanatomical similarities with pterosaurs. The results of the latter study were subsequently supported by an independent analysis of early pterosauromorph interrelationships. 

A related problem is the origin of pterosaur flight. Like with birds, hypotheses can be ordered into two main varieties: "ground up" or "tree down". Climbing a tree would cause height and gravity to provide both the energy and a strong selection pressure for incipient flight. Rupert Wild in 1983 proposed a hypothetical "propterosaurus": a lizard-like arboreal animal developing a membrane between its limbs, first to safely parachute and then, gradually elongating the fourth finger, to glide. However, subsequent cladistic results did not fit this model well. Neither protorosaurs nor ornithodirans are biologically equivalent to lizards. Furthermore, the transition between gliding and flapping flight is not well-understood. More recent studies on basal pterosaur hindlimb morphology seem to vindicate a connection to Scleromochlus. Like this archosaur, basal pterosaur lineages have plantigrade hindlimbs that show adaptations for saltation.

At least one study found that the early Triassic ichnofossil Prorotodactylus is anatomically similar to that of early pterosaurs.

Extinction

It was once thought that competition with early bird species might have resulted in the extinction of many of the pterosaurs. It was thought that by the end of the Cretaceous, only large species of pterosaurs were present (no longer true; see below). The smaller species were thought to have become extinct, their niche filled by birds. However, pterosaur decline (if actually present) seems unrelated to bird diversity, as ecological overlap between the two groups appears to be minimal. In fact, at least some avian niches were reclaimed by pterosaurs prior to the KT event. At the end of the Cretaceous period, the Cretaceous–Paleogene extinction event, which wiped out all non-avian dinosaurs and most avian dinosaurs as well, and many other animals, seems also to have taken the pterosaurs.

In the early 2010s, several new pterosaur taxa were discovered dating to the Campanian/Maastrichtian, such as the ornithocheirids Piksi and "Ornithocheirus", possible pteranodontids and nyctosaurids, several tapejarids and the indeterminate non-azhdarchid Navajodactylus. Small azhdarchoid pterosaurs were also present in the Campanian. This suggests that late Cretaceous pterosaur faunas were far more diverse than previously thought, possibly not even having declined significantly from the early Cretaceous.

Small-sized pterosaur species apparently were present in the Csehbánya Formation, indicating a higher diversity of Late Cretaceous pterosaurs than previously accounted for. The recent findings of a small cat-sized adult azhdarchid further indicate that small pterosaurs from the Late Cretaceous might actually have simply been rarely preserved in the fossil record, helped by the fact that there is a strong bias against terrestrial small sized vertebrates such as juvenile dinosaurs, and that their diversity might actually have been much larger than previously thought.

At least some non-pterodactyloid pterosaurs survived into the Late Cretaceous, postulating a Lazarus taxa situation for late Cretaceous pterosaur faunas.

A 2021 study showcases that niches previously occupied by small pterosaurs were increasingly occupied by the juvenile stages of larger species in the Late Cretaceous. Rather than outcompeted by birds, pterosaurs essentially specialized a trend already occurring in previous eras of the Mesozoic.

Classification and phylogeny

In phylogenetic taxonomy, the clade Pterosauria has usually been defined as node-based and anchored to several extensively studied taxa as well as those thought to be primitive. One 2003 study defined Pterosauria as "The most recent common ancestor of the Anurognathidae, Preondactylus and Quetzalcoatlus and all their descendants." However, these types of definition would inevitably leave any related species that are slightly more primitive out of the Pterosauria. To remedy this, a new definition was proposed that would anchor the name not to any particular species but to an anatomical feature, the presence of an enlarged fourth finger that supports a wing membrane. This "apomorophy-based" definition was adopted by the PhyloCode in 2020 as "[T]he clade characterized by the apomorphy fourth manual digit hypertrophied to support a wing membrane, as inherited by Pterodactylus (originally Ornithocephalus) antiquus (Sömmerring 1812)". A broader clade, Pterosauromorpha, has been defined as all ornithodirans more closely related to pterosaurs than to dinosaurs.

The internal classification of pterosaurs has historically been difficult, because there were many gaps in the fossil record. Starting from the 21st century, new discoveries are now filling in these gaps and giving a better picture of the evolution of pterosaurs. Traditionally, they were organized into two suborders: the Rhamphorhynchoidea, a "primitive" group of long-tailed pterosaurs, and the Pterodactyloidea, "advanced" pterosaurs with short tails. However, this traditional division has been largely abandoned. Rhamphorhynchoidea is a paraphyletic (unnatural) group, since the pterodactyloids evolved directly from them and not from a common ancestor, so, with the increasing use of cladistics, it has fallen out of favor among most scientists.

The precise relationships between pterosaurs is still unsettled. Many studies of pterosaur relationships in the past have included limited data and were highly contradictory. However, newer studies using larger data sets are beginning to make things clearer. The cladogram (family tree) below follows a phylogenetic analysis presented by Longrich, Martill and Andres in 2018, with clade names after Andres et al. (2014).

Paleobiology

Flight
The mechanics of pterosaur flight are not completely understood or modeled at this time.

Katsufumi Sato, a Japanese scientist, did calculations using modern birds and concluded that it was impossible for a pterosaur to stay aloft. In the book Posture, Locomotion, and Paleoecology of Pterosaurs it is theorized that they were able to fly due to the oxygen-rich, dense atmosphere of the Late Cretaceous period. However, both Sato and the authors of Posture, Locomotion, and Paleoecology of Pterosaurs based their research on the now-outdated theories of pterosaurs being seabird-like, and the size limit does not apply to terrestrial pterosaurs, such as azhdarchids and tapejarids. Furthermore, Darren Naish concluded that atmospheric differences between the present and the Mesozoic were not needed for the giant size of pterosaurs.

Another issue that has been difficult to understand is how they took off. Earlier suggestions were that pterosaurs were largely cold-blooded gliding animals, deriving warmth from the environment like modern lizards, rather than burning calories. In this case, it was unclear how the larger ones of enormous size, with an inefficient cold-blooded metabolism, could manage a bird-like takeoff strategy, using only the hind limbs to generate thrust for getting airborne. Later research shows them instead as being warm-blooded and having powerful flight muscles, and using the flight muscles for walking as quadrupeds. Mark Witton of the University of Portsmouth and Mike Habib of Johns Hopkins University suggested that pterosaurs used a vaulting mechanism to obtain flight. The tremendous power of their winged forelimbs would enable them to take off with ease.

In 1985, the Smithsonian Institution commissioned aeronautical engineer Paul MacCready to build a half-scale working model of Quetzalcoatlus northropi. The replica was launched with a ground-based winch. It flew several times in 1986 and was filmed as part of the Smithsonian's IMAX film On the Wing.

Large-headed species are thought to have forwardly swept their wings in order to better balance.

Air sacs and respiration
A 2009 study showed that pterosaurs had a lung-and-air-sac system and a precisely controlled skeletal breathing pump, which supports a flow-through pulmonary ventilation model in pterosaurs, analogous to that of birds. The presence of a subcutaneous air sac system in at least some pterodactyloids would have further reduced the density of the living animal. Like modern crocodilians, pterosaurs appeared to have had a hepatic piston, seeing as their shoulder-pectoral girdles were too inflexible to move the sternum as in birds, and they possessed strong gastralia. Thus, their respiratory system had characteristics comparable to both modern archosaur clades.

Nervous system
An X-ray study of pterosaur brain cavities revealed that the animals (Rhamphorhynchus muensteri and Anhanguera santanae) had massive flocculi. The flocculus is a brain region that integrates signals from joints, muscles, skin and balance organs. The pterosaurs' flocculi occupied 7.5% of the animals' total brain mass, more than in any other vertebrate. Birds have unusually large flocculi compared with other animals, but these only occupy between 1 and 2% of total brain mass.

The flocculus sends out neural signals that produce small, automatic movements in the eye muscles. These keep the image on an animal's retina steady. Pterosaurs may have had such a large flocculus because of their large wing size, which would mean that there was a great deal more sensory information to process. The low relative mass of the flocculi in birds is also a result of birds having a much larger brain overall; though this has been considered an indication that pterosaurs lived in a structurally simpler environment or had less complex behaviour compared to birds, recent studies of crocodilians and other reptiles show that it is common for sauropsids to achieve high intelligence levels with small brains. Studies on the endocast of Allkaruen show that brain evolution in pterodactyloids was a modular process.

Ground movement

Pterosaurs' hip sockets are oriented facing slightly upwards, and the head of the femur (thigh bone) is only moderately inward facing, suggesting that pterosaurs had an erect stance. It would have been possible to lift the thigh into a horizontal position during flight, as gliding lizards do.

There was considerable debate whether pterosaurs ambulated as quadrupeds or as bipeds. In the 1980s, paleontologist Kevin Padian suggested that smaller pterosaurs with longer hindlimbs, such as Dimorphodon, might have walked or even run bipedally, in addition to flying, like road runners. However, a large number of pterosaur trackways were later found with a distinctive four-toed hind foot and three-toed front foot; these are the unmistakable prints of pterosaurs walking on all fours.

Fossil footprints show that pterosaurs stood with the entire foot in contact with the ground (plantigrade), in a manner similar to many mammals like humans and bears. Footprints from azhdarchids and several unidentified species show that pterosaurs walked with an erect posture with their four limbs held almost vertically beneath the body, an energy-efficient stance used by most modern birds and mammals, rather than the sprawled limbs of modern reptiles. Indeed, erect-limbs may be omnipresent in pterosaurs.

Though traditionally depicted as ungainly and awkward when on the ground, the anatomy of some pterosaurs (particularly pterodactyloids) suggests that they were competent walkers and runners. Early pterosaurs have long been considered particularly cumbersome locomotors due to the presence of large cruropatagia, but they too appear to have been generally efficient on the ground.

The forelimb bones of azhdarchids and ornithocheirids were unusually long compared to other pterosaurs, and, in azhdarchids, the bones of the arm and hand (metacarpals) were particularly elongated. Furthermore, as a whole, azhdarchid front limbs were proportioned similarly to fast-running ungulate mammals. Their hind limbs, on the other hand, were not built for speed, but they were long compared with most pterosaurs, and allowed for a long stride length. While azhdarchid pterosaurs probably could not run, they would have been relatively fast and energy efficient.

The relative size of the hands and feet in pterosaurs (by comparison with modern animals such as birds) may indicate the type of lifestyle pterosaurs led on the ground. Azhdarchid pterosaurs had relatively small feet compared to their body size and leg length, with foot length only about 25–30% the length of the lower leg. This suggests that azhdarchids were better adapted to walking on dry, relatively solid ground. Pteranodon had slightly larger feet (47% the length of the tibia), while filter-feeding pterosaurs like the ctenochasmatoids had very large feet (69% of tibial length in Pterodactylus, 84% in Pterodaustro), adapted to walking in soft muddy soil, similar to modern wading birds. Though clearly forelimb-based launchers, basal pterosaurs have hindlimbs well adapted for hopping, suggesting a connection with archosaurs such as Scleromochlus.

Swimming
Tracks made by ctenochasmatoids indicate that these pterosaurs swam using their hindlimbs. In general, these have large hindfeet and long torsos, indicating that they were probably more adapted for swimming than other pterosaurs. Pteranodontians conversely have several speciations in their humeri interpreted to have been suggestive of a water-based version of the typical quadrupedal launch, and several like boreopterids must have foraged while swimming, as they seem incapable of frigatebird-like aerial hawking. These adaptations are also seen in terrestrial pterosaurs like azhdarchids, which presumably still needed to launch from water in case they found themselves in it. The nyctosaurid Alcione may display adaptations for wing-propelled diving like modern gannets and tropicbirds.

Diet and feeding habits
Traditionally, almost all pterosaurs were seen as surface-feeding piscivores or fish-eaters, a view that still dominates popular science. Today, many pterosaurs groups are thought to have been terrestrial carnivores, omnivores or insectivores.

Early-on it was recognised that the small Anurognathidae were nocturnal, aerial insectivores. With highly flexible joints on the wing finger, a broad, triangular wing shape, large eyes and short tail, these pterosaurs were likely analogous to nightjars or extant insectivorous bats, being capable of high manoeuvrability at relatively low speeds.

Interpretations of the habits of basal groups have changed profoundly.  Dimorphodon, envisioned as a puffin analogue in the past, is indicated by its jaw structure, gait, and poor flight capabilities, as a terrestrial/semiarboreal predator of small mammals, squamates, and large insects. Its robust dentition caused Campylognathoides to be seen as a generalist or a terrestrial predator of small vertebrates, but the highly robust humerus and high-aspect wing morphology, suggest it may have been capable of grabbing prey on the wing. The small insectivorous Carniadactylus and the larger Eudimorphodon were highly aerial animals and fast, agile flyers with long robust wings. Eudimorphodon has been found with fish remains in its stomach, but its dentition suggests an opportunistic diet. Slender-winged Austriadactylus and Caviramus were likely terrestrial/semiarboreal generalists. Caviramus likely had a strong bite force, indicating an adaptation towards hard food items that might have been chewed in view of the tooth wear.

Some Rhamphorhynchidae, such as Rhamphorhynchus itself or Dorygnathus, were fish-eaters with long, slender wings, needle-like dentition and long, thin jaws. Sericipterus, Scaphognathus and Harpactognathus had more robust jaws and teeth (which were ziphodont, dagger-shaped, in  Sericipterus), and shorter, broader wings. These were either terrestrial/aerial predators of vertebrates or corvid-like generalists. Wukongopteridae like Darwinopterus were first considered aerial predators. Lacking a robust jaw structure or powerful flying muscles, they are now seen as arboreal or semiterrestrial insectivores. Darwinopterus robustidens, in particular, seems to have been a beetle specialist.

Among pterodactyloids, a greater variation in diet is present. Pteranodontia contained many piscivorous taxa, such as the Ornithocheirae, Boreopteridae, Pteranodontidae and Nyctosauridae. Niche partitioning caused ornithocheirans and the later nyctosaurids to be aerial dip-feeders like today's frigatebirds (with the exception of the plunge-diving adapted Alcione elainus), while boreopterids were freshwater diving animals similar to cormorants, and pteranodonts pelagic plunge-divers akin to boobies and gannets. An analysis of Lonchodraco found clusters of foramina at the tip of its beak; birds with similarly numerous foramina have sensitive beaks used to feel for food, so Lonchodraco may have used its beak to feel for fish or invertebrates in shallow water. The istiodactylids were likely primarily scavengers. Archaeopterodactyloidea obtained food in coastal or freshwater habitats. Germanodactylus and Pterodactylus were piscivores, while the Ctenochasmatidae were suspension feeders, using their numerous fine teeth to filter small organisms from shallow water. Pterodaustro was adapted for flamingo-like filter-feeding.

In contrast, Azhdarchoidea mostly were terrestrial pterosaurs. Tapejaridae were arboreal omnivores, supplementing seeds and fruits with small insects and vertebrates. Dsungaripteridae were specialist molluscivores, using their powerful jaws to crush the shells of molluscs and crustaceans. Thalassodromidae were likely terrestrial carnivores. Thalassodromeus itself was named after a fishing method known as "skim-feeding", later understood to be biomechanically impossible. Perhaps it pursued relatively large prey, in view of its reinforced jaw joints and relatively high bite force. Azhdarchidae are now understood to be terrestrial predators akin to ground hornbills or some storks, eating any prey item they could swallow whole. Hatzegopteryx was a robustly built predator of relatively large prey, including medium-sized dinosaurs. Alanqa may have been a specialist molluscivore.

A 2021 study reconstructed the adductor musculature of skulls from pterodactyloids, estimating the bite force and potential dietary habits of nine selected species. The study corroborated the view of pteranodontids, nyctosaurids and anhanuerids as piscivores based on them being relatively weak but fast biters, and suggest that Tropeognathus mesembrinus was specialised in consuming relatively large prey compared to Anhanguera. Dsungaripterus was corroborated as a durophage, with Thalassodromeus proposed to share this feeding habit based on high estimated bite force quotients (BFQ) and absolute bite force values. Tapejara wellnhoferi was corroborated as a specialised consumer of hard plant material with a relatively high BFQ and high mechanical advantage, and Caupedactylus ybaka and Tupuxuara leonardii were proposed to be ground-feeding generalists with intermediate bite force values and less specialised jaws.

Natural predators
Pterosaurs are known to have been eaten by theropods. In the 1 July 2004 edition of Nature, paleontologist Eric Buffetaut discusses an Early Cretaceous fossil of three cervical vertebrae of a pterosaur with the broken tooth of a spinosaur, most likely Irritator, embedded in it. The vertebrae are known not to have been eaten and exposed to digestion, as the joints are still articulated.

Reproduction and life history

While very little is known about pterosaur reproduction, it is believed that, similar to all dinosaurs, all pterosaurs reproduced by laying eggs, though such findings are very rare. The first known pterosaur egg was found in the quarries of Liaoning, the same place that yielded feathered dinosaurs. The egg was squashed flat with no signs of cracking, so evidently the eggs had leathery shells, as in modern lizards. This was supported by the description of an additional pterosaur egg belonging to the genus Darwinopterus, described in 2011, which also had a leathery shell and, also like modern reptiles but unlike birds, was fairly small compared to the size of the mother. In 2014 five unflattened eggs from the species Hamipterus tianshanensis were found in an Early Cretaceous deposit in northwest China. Examination of the shells by scanning electron microscopy showed the presence of a thin calcareous eggshell layer with a membrane underneath. A study of pterosaur eggshell structure and chemistry published in 2007 indicated that it is likely pterosaurs buried their eggs, like modern crocodiles and turtles. Egg-burying would have been beneficial to the early evolution of pterosaurs, as it allows for more weight-reducing adaptations, but this method of reproduction would also have put limits on the variety of environments pterosaurs could live in, and may have disadvantaged them when they began to face ecological competition from birds.

A Darwinopterus specimen showcases that at least some pterosaurs had a pair of functional ovaries, as opposed to the single functional ovary in birds, dismissing the reduction of functional ovaries as a requirement for powered flight.

Wing membranes preserved in pterosaur embryos are well developed, suggesting that pterosaurs were ready to fly soon after birth. However, tomography scans of fossilised Hamipterus eggs suggests that the young pterosaurs had well-developed thigh bones for walking, but weak chests for flight. It is unknown if this holds true for other pterosaurs. Fossils of pterosaurs only a few days to a week old (called "flaplings") have been found, representing several pterosaur families, including pterodactylids, rhamphorhinchids, ctenochasmatids and azhdarchids. All preserve bones that show a relatively high degree of hardening (ossification) for their age, and wing proportions similar to adults. In fact, many pterosaur flaplings have been considered adults and placed in separate species in the past. Additionally, flaplings are normally found in the same sediments as adults and juveniles of the same species, such as the Pterodactylus and Rhamphorhynchus flaplings found in the Solnhofen limestone of Germany, and Pterodaustro flaplings from Argentina. All are found in deep aquatic environment far from shore.

For the majority of pterosaur species, it is not known whether they practiced any form of parental care, but their ability to fly as soon as they emerged from the egg and the numerous flaplings found in environments far from nests and alongside adults has led most researchers, including Christopher Bennett and David Unwin, to conclude that the young were dependent on their parents for a relatively short period of time, during a period of rapid growth while the wings grew long enough to fly, and then left the nest to fend for themselves, possibly within days of hatching. Alternatively, they may have used stored yolk products for nourishment during their first few days of life, as in modern reptiles, rather than depend on parents for food. Fossilised Hamipterus nests were shown preserving many male and female pterosaurs together with their eggs in a manner to a similar to that of modern seabird colonies. Due to how underdeveloped the chests of the hatchlings were for flying, it was suggested that Hamipterus may have practiced some form of parental care. However, this study has since been criticised. Most evidence currently leans towards pterosaur hatchlings being superprecocial, similar to that of megapode birds, which fly after hatching without the need of parental care. A further study compares evidence for superprecociality and "late term flight" and overwhelmingly suggests that most if not all pterosaurs were capable of flight soon after hatching.

Growth rates of pterosaurs once they hatched varied across different groups. In more primitive, long-tailed pterosaurs ("rhamphorhynchoids"), such as Rhamphorhynchus, the average growth rate during the first year of life was 130% to 173%, slightly faster than the growth rate of alligators. Growth in these species slowed after sexual maturity, and it would have taken more than three years for Rhamphorhynchus to attain maximum size. In contrast, the more advanced, large pterodactyloid pterosaurs, such as Pteranodon, grew to adult size within the first year of life. Additionally, pterodactyloids had determinate growth, meaning that the animals reached a fixed maximum adult size and stopped growing.

A 2021 study indicates that pterosaur juveniles of larger species increasingly took the roles previously occupied by adult small pterosaurs.

Daily activity patterns
Comparisons between the scleral rings of pterosaurs and modern birds and reptiles have been used to infer daily activity patterns of pterosaurs. The pterosaur genera Pterodactylus, Scaphognathus, and Tupuxuara have been inferred to be diurnal, Ctenochasma, Pterodaustro, and Rhamphorhynchus have been inferred to be nocturnal, and Tapejara has been inferred to be cathemeral, being active throughout the day for short intervals. As a result, the possibly fish-eating Ctenochasma and Rhamphorhynchus may have had similar activity patterns to modern nocturnal seabirds, and the filter-feeding Pterodaustro may have had similar activity patterns to modern anseriform birds that feed at night. The differences between activity patterns of the Solnhofen pterosaurs Ctenochasma, Rhamphorhynchus, Scaphognathus, and Pterodactylus may also indicate niche partitioning between these genera.

Cultural significance

Pterosaurs have been a staple of popular culture for as long as their cousins the dinosaurs, though they are usually not featured as prominently in films, literature or other art. While the depiction of dinosaurs in popular media has changed radically in response to advances in paleontology, a mainly outdated picture of pterosaurs has persisted since the mid-20th century.

The vague generic term "pterodactyl" is often used for these creatures. The animals depicted in fiction and pop culture frequently represent either the Pteranodon or (non-pterodactyloid) Rhamphorhynchus, or a fictionalized hybrid of the two. Many children's toys and cartoons feature "pterodactyls" with Pteranodon-like crests and long, Rhamphorhynchus-like tails and teeth, a combination that never existed in nature. However, at least one pterosaur did have both the Pteranodon-like crest and teeth: Ludodactylus, whose name means "toy finger" for its resemblance to old, inaccurate children's toys. Pterosaurs have sometimes been incorrectly identified as (the ancestors of) birds, though birds are theropod dinosaurs and not descendants of pterosaurs.

Pterosaurs were used in fiction in Sir Arthur Conan Doyle's 1912 novel The Lost World and its 1925 film adaptation. They appeared in a number of films and television programs since, including the 1933 film King Kong, and 1966's One Million Years B.C. In the latter, animator Ray Harryhausen had to add inaccurate bat-like wing fingers to his stop motion models in order to keep the membranes from falling apart, though this particular error was common in art even before the film was made. Rodan, a fictional giant monster (or kaiju) which first appeared in the 1956 film Rodan, is portrayed as an enormous irradiated species of Pteranodon. Rodan has appeared in multiple Japanese Godzilla films released during the 1960s, 1970s, 1990s, and 2000s, and also appeared in the 2019 American-produced film Godzilla: King of the Monsters.

After the 1960s, pterosaurs remained mostly absent from notable American film appearances until 2001's Jurassic Park III. Paleontologist Dave Hone noted that the pterosaurs in this film had not been significantly updated to reflect modern research. Errors persisting were teeth while toothless Pteranodon was intended to be depicted, nesting behavior that was known to be inaccurate by 2001, and leathery wings, rather than the taut membranes of muscle fiber required for pterosaur flight. Petrie from The Land Before Time (1988), is a notable example from an animated film.

In most media appearances, pterosaurs are depicted as piscivores, not reflecting their full dietary variation. They are also often shown as aerial predators similar to birds of prey, grasping human victims with talons on their feet. However, only the small anurognathid Vesperopterylus and small wukongopterid Kunpengopterus are known to possess prehensile feet and hands respectively; all other known pterosaurs have flat, plantigrade feet with no opposable toes, and the feet are generally proportionally small, at least in the case of the Pteranodontia.

See also

 Flying and gliding animals
 Graphical timeline of pterosaurs
 List of pterosaur-bearing stratigraphic units
 List of pterosaur genera
 Phylogeny of pterosaurs
 Pterosaur Beach
 Pterosaur size
 Timeline of pterosaur research

Explanatory notes

References

Sources

External links

 Pterosaur.net, multi-authored website about all aspects of pterosaur science
 The Pterosaur Database, by Paul Pursglove
 "Comments on the phylogeny of the pterodactyloidea", by Alexander W. A. Kellner (technical)

 
Late Triassic first appearances
Maastrichtian extinctions
Pterosauromorpha